Woodsend is a hamlet in the civil parish of Aldbourne in Wiltshire, England.

Woodsend had a population of 84 in 1851 but decreased in size in the early 20th century. A Wesleyan Methodist chapel was built around 1845 and closed in 1913. A National school for about 20 pupils was opened in 1855 and closed before 1913.

References

Hamlets in Wiltshire